Siniperca or the Chinese perch is a genus of temperate perches native to freshwater habitats in continental East Asia.  Although its native ranges can extend to northern Vietnam, the majority of the species are entirely or largely restricted to China.

Species
The currently recognized species in this genus are:
 Siniperca chuatsi (Basilewsky, 1855) (mandarin fish)
 Siniperca fortis (S. Y. Lin, 1932) 
 Siniperca kneri Garman, 1912 (big-eye mandarin fish)
 Siniperca liuzhouensis C. W. Zhou, X. Y. Kong & S. R. Zhu, 1987
 Siniperca loona H. W. Wu, 1939 
 Siniperca obscura Nichols, 1930
 Siniperca roulei H. W. Wu, 1930
 Siniperca scherzeri Steindachner, 1892 (golden or leopard mandarin fish)
 Siniperca undulata P. W. Fang & L. T. Chong, 1932
 Siniperca vietnamensis Đ. Y. Mai, 1978

References

External links 

 
 

 
Sinipercidae